Illia Mykhalchyk (born August 17, 1996), is a motorcycle racer from Kyiv, Ukraine, who has competed in the 2022 FIM Endurance World Championship and Superbike World Championship with BMW Motorrad.

Racing background 
Mykhalchyk began his motorcycle racing career in 2012, in the European Junior Cup with Wind Racing. He finished tenth in 2012 with a podium. In 2013, he dropped 10 places and finished 20th, with a best finish of tenth. He then moved up to the European Superstock 600 Championship with Team GO Eleven, and finished sixth in his first season. In 2015, he dropped to 13th. He joined the Supersport World Championship in 2016, and finished 15th. in 2017, he joined the European Superstock 1000 Championship, finishing in ninth with a second place podium.

He has replaced Michael van der Mark in the 2022 Superbike World Championship for Shaun Muir Racing in the rounds van der Mark was unable to participate in, due to injury.

Career statistics

Motorcycle racing

Career summary

Superbike World Championship

By season

Races by year
(key) (Races in bold indicate pole position) (Races in italics indicate fastest lap)

* Season still in progress.

References

Sources 

Ukrainian motorcycle racers
1996 births
Living people
Supersport World Championship riders
Superbike World Championship riders